An ocean is a major body of salt water.

Ocean may also refer to:

Bodies of water
The sea
World Ocean, also known as Global Ocean or World Sea

Places
 Ocean (Muni), a station on the San Francisco Municipal Railway light rail network
 Océan, a department of South Province in Cameroon
 Ocean, Maryland, a small town in the United States
 Ocean County, New Jersey, United States
 Ocean Harbour, South Georgia

People
 Ocean Hellman (born 1971), Canadian former actress
 Ocean Ramsey (born 1987), marine biologist and shark conservationist
 Ocean Vuong (born 1988), a Vietnamese-American writer
 Billy Ocean, a British pop recording artist
 Danny Ocean (singer), Venezuelan singer and producer
 Frank Ocean, an American recording artist

Arts, entertainment, and media

Music

Groups
 Ocean (band), a 1970s Canadian gospel rock band
 Oceán (Czech band), a 1990s Czech synth-pop band
 The Ocean (band), a 2000s German post-metal band

Albums
 Ocean (Eloy album), 1977
 Ocean (Stephan Micus album), 1986
 Ocean (Bebo Norman album), 2010
 Ocean (Lady Antebellum album), 2019
 Ocean (Karol G album), 2019
 Oceans (Esprit D'Air album), 2022

Extended plays
 Oceans (EP), a 2013 EP by Hillsong United

Songs
 "Ocean" (B'z song), 2005
 "Ocean" (Karol G song), 2019
 "Ocean" (Goldfrapp song), 2017
 "Ocean" (Martin Garrix song), 2018
 "Ocean" (Spencer Tracy song), 2003
 "Ocean" (Sebadoh song), 1996
 "Oceans" (Coldplay song), 2014
 "Oceans" (Evanescence song), 2011
 "Oceans" (Jay-Z song), 2013
 "Oceans" (Morning Runner song), 2006
 "Oceans" (Pearl Jam song), 1992
 "Oceans" (The Tea Party song), 2005
 "Oceans (Where Feet May Fail)", a song by Hillsong United, 2013
 "The Ocean" (Led Zeppelin song), 1973
 "The Ocean" (Steve Angello song), 2015
 "The Ocean", a song from the 1980 U2 album Boy
 "The Ocean" (Mike Perry song), 2016
 "Ocean", a song by Cold on the 2005 album A Different Kind of Pain
 "Ocean", a song by the John Butler Trio on the 1998 album John Butler
 "Ocean", a song by Lady Antebellum on the 2019 album Ocean
 "Ocean", a song by Slightly Stoopid on the 2007 album Chronchitis
 "Ocean", a song from Lou Reed's 1972 eponymous debut solo album
an earlier version recorded by the Velvet Underground is found on their box set Peel Slowly and See
 "Ocean", a song by Matt Brouwer on the 2012 album Till the Sunrise
 "Oceans", a song by Rebecca Ferguson on the 2016 album Superwoman
 "Oceans", a song by Gary Numan on the 1979 album The Pleasure Principle
 "Oceans", a song by The Format on the 2006 album Dog Problems
 "The Ocean" (Against Me!), a song by Against Me! on the 2007 album New Wave
 "The Ocean", by Sunny Day Real Estate on the 2000 album The Rising Tide
 "The Ocean", a song by Tegan and Sara on the 2009 album Sainthood

Radio stations
 Ocean FM (Cayman Islands), a defunct radio station in the Cayman Islands 
 Ocean FM (Ireland), a local radio station that broadcasts to the northwest of Ireland
 Ocean FM (UK)

Television
 "Ocean" (Wonder Showzen episode)
 Oceans (TV series), an eight-part series on BBC Two

Other arts, entertainment, and media
 Ocean (comics), a miniseries by Warren Ellis and Chris Sprouse
 Ocean (Marvel Comics), a superhuman mutant
 Ocean Productions, an animation recording company
 Ocean Software, a video game publisher
 Oceans (film), a documentary by Jacques Perrin
 AS Ocean, a former Larvik company operating a whaling station and light railway in South Georgia

Resorts
 Ocean Resort Casino, in Atlantic City, New Jersey

Transport

Air transport
 Ocean Airlines, a cargo airline based in Brescia, Italy

Rail transport
 Ocean (train), a Canadian passenger train

Ships
 Ocean (East Indiaman), a name given to several East Indiamen that sailed for the Honourable East India Company
 Ocean (ship), a name given to several vessels that brought convicts from Britain to Australia
 HMS Ocean, a name given to several Royal Navy vessels
 Ocean 40, an American sailboat design
 Océan-class ironclads built for the French navy
 USS Ocean, a U.S. Navy ship

Other uses
 Big Five personality traits, known as the OCEAN model of personality
 Cosmic ocean, a mythological motif
 Helio Ocean, a mobile device
 Ocean Racing Technology, a Portuguese auto racing team

See also
 
 
 Gyatso
 Ocean City (disambiguation)
 Ocean Island (disambiguation)
 Oceana (disambiguation)
 Oceania (disambiguation)
 Oceanic (disambiguation)
 Oceanus (disambiguation)